55 West, commonly referenced as, simply, 55 W, is an apartment tower in Downtown Orlando. The building overlooks Church Street Station, and stands next to the Suntrust Center. Built in 2009, the building is the fifth-tallest building in downtown

Details
The building has a slanted almost "house-like" roof compared with traditional, flat roofs found on many commercial buildings within the area. The top point is lit blue at night. This all makes the building a unique part of the skyline, especially at night.

The building's pool is elevated and overlooks central downtown. The pool has a tropical theme.

The building has multiple amenities and houses a convenience store and restaurant on the ground floor. The associated development across Church Street contains a piano bar and the Mad Cow Theatre complex.

In 2017 Blackstone Real Estate Income Trust (BREIT Mf 55 West LLC) purchased the building for $105,000,000 from TA Realty (Realty Associates Fund Ix Lp). The building is now managed by ZRS, Greystar managed the building for the previous owner.

References

External links 
 – Apartment leasing
 – Resident portal

Residential skyscrapers in Florida
Skyscrapers in Orlando, Florida
Residential buildings completed in 2009
2009 establishments in Florida